Joannes Hauchin (1527 – 1589) was the second Archbishop of Mechelen from 1583 to 1589. His term as Archbishop was marked by the disturbances attendant on the Dutch Revolt.

Early life
Born at Geraardsbergen, Hauchin studied philosophy at Leuven University and theology at the University of Dole and the University of Douai, where he graduated Licentiate of Sacred Theology. He was chaplain to William the Silent and in 1571 dean of Brussels minster. On 23 February 1580, the city council of Brussels (then Calvinist) ordered him, as vicar general of the diocese, to publish a decree suppressing feastdays of saints, which he refused to do. On 7 May 1580 he took part in a public disputation with Calvinists about the nature of the Eucharist. After other clashes with the civic authorities, he spent three months in prison.

Archbishop
On 30 October 1583 he was consecrated archbishop of Mechelen at Tournai (Mechelen itself then being in rebel hands). He entered his see in 1585. On 8 November 1585, the remnants of the relics of St Rumbold of Mechelen, saved from the desecration of the cathedral during the period of Calvinist rule, were solemnly deposited in the saint's tomb in the cathedral.

In 1588 he had the Pastorale Mechliniense, commissioned from the theologians of Leuven University, published by Christophe Plantin in Antwerp. This was a handbook of the rites to be used by priests throughout the ecclesiastical province.

Archbishop Hauchin died on 5 January 1589.

References

1527 births
1589 deaths
16th-century Roman Catholic archbishops in the Holy Roman Empire
Flemish priests
Roman Catholic archbishops of Mechelen-Brussels
Old University of Leuven alumni
University of Dole alumni
University of Douai alumni